Ann Burdette Coe (May 1874 in New Jersey — January 11, 1947 in Englewood, New Jersey) was an American tennis player of the start of the 20th century.

Career
Coe won the 1906 US Women's National Championship title in women's doubles with Ethel Bliss-Platt defeating Helen Homans and Clover Boldt in straight sets.

Grand Slam finals

Doubles (1 title)

References

1874 births
1947 deaths
American female tennis players
Grand Slam (tennis) champions in women's doubles
Tennis people from New Jersey
United States National champions (tennis)